Jade O'Dowda (born 9 September 1999) is an English international athlete, competing in the women's heptathlon

She represented England at the 2022 Commonwealth Games, winning a bronze medal.  She then represented Great Britain in the 2022 European Championships, finishing seventh.

Biography
O'Dowda was educated at Sheffield Hallam University and is the sister of footballer Callum O'Dowda. In 2018, she entered the world's top 40 heptathletes and finished 7th at the World U20 Championships. She is a former Oxford City AC athlete.

In 2022, she was selected for the women's heptathlon event at the 2022 Commonwealth Games in Birmingham. In the event she secured a bronze medal behind Katarina Johnson-Thompson.

References

1999 births
Living people
British heptathletes
English heptathletes
Commonwealth Games competitors for England
Athletes (track and field) at the 2022 Commonwealth Games
Commonwealth Games bronze medallists for England
Medallists at the 2022 Commonwealth Games